New Jersey Monthly is an American monthly magazine featuring issues of possible interest to residents of New Jersey. The magazine was started in 1976. It is based in Morristown. In addition to articles of general interest, the publication features occasional special subject issues covering and ranking high schools, lawyers, doctors and municipalities. It is a member of the City and Regional Magazine Association (CRMA).

References

External links
Official website

Lifestyle magazines published in the United States
Monthly magazines published in the United States
Local interest magazines published in the United States
Magazines established in 1976
Magazines published in New Jersey
1976 establishments in New Jersey